Caipora  is an entity of the Tupi-Guarani mythology in Brazil. The word "Caipora" comes from tupi and means "inhabitant of the forest".

It is represented as a dark-skinned, small Native American, naked with a very long red mane, smoking a cigar and very mischievous. Sometimes Caipora is depicted as a girl and other times as a boy. The representation of the creature varies among the different regions of Brazil, and is sometimes confused with Curupira, which is another mythological creature who protects the forest. Curupira is often depicted as a boy with red hair, who has his feet turned backwards in order to deceive trackers.

In some regions, the indigenous tribes believed that the Caipora was afraid of the light. For this reason, they would walk around the forest protecting themselves using firebrands. Some say it rides a great peccary holding a stick. In some other areas of Brazil, the Caipora is considered to be a cannibal and would eat anything, even the smallest insects.

The Caipora is known as a forest dweller, as a king of the animals of sorts, and is very vengeful of hunters who do not respect the rules of "fair-play" when hunting. It is told that it scares away prey and "hides" animal tracks or makes hunters lose their way in the jungle. It disorients the hunters by simulating animal noises and by leaving fake tracks.

According to a popular belief, its activity intensifies on those days in which hunting is not supposed to take place, therefore on Fridays, Sundays and the religious days. Religious beliefs prohibited hunting on certain days, but there are claims about ways to trick the protector of the forest. It is known that the Caipora likes smoke, so on Thursday nights, the hunters would leave smoke by the trunk of a tree and say "Toma, Caipora, deixa eu ir embora" (which means "Here you go, Caipora, let me leave" in Portuguese). The good luck of hunters is also due to the propitiatory gifts that were offered to the creature.

Pop culture references
In the children's TV series Castelo Rá-Tim-Bum, Caipora is a regular character. In this version is characterized as a female creature with a big red fur and a black mask. She has the ability to teleport when hear whistles and sometimes demonstrates wild aspects. The character has also made an appearance in a TV adaptation of Sítio do Picapau Amarelo, but being a male creature.

In Harry Potter, the Caipora protect the magical school Castelobruxo in Brazil. They are described as small, furry, and extremely mischievous.

Artes do Caipora em Cordel, an illustrated children's book written by the poet and folklorist Marco Haurélio and illustrated by Luciano Tasso, was published in 2013. The story accounts as a hunter who disobeys his father by going to hunt on a holy day; he finds the Caipora, who resuscitates all the animals that he slaughtered.

Uses of the word "Caipora" and its derivatives
In the northeast area of Brazil, they say that being Caipora means that you are going through tough times, with bad luck and unhappiness.

Some Brazilian writers, which include Machado de Assis and Aluísio de Azevedo, used the words "Caipora" and "Caiporism" to identify a state of misfortune.

The word "Caipora" has also been used to describe the slaves who had escaped into the forests.

See also
 Mohan (legendary)
 Nhanderuvuçu
 Mono Grande
 Patasola

References

Brazilian mythology
Fairies
Guaraní legendary creatures
Tupí legendary creatures
Forest spirits